Jan Marsh is a British writer and curator who is an expert on the Victorian period and particularly the Pre-Raphaelites and William Morris.
Marsh is president of the William Morris Society, a trustee of the William Morris Gallery and a fellow of the Royal Historical Society.

Selected publications
Bloomsbury Women: Distinct Figures in Life and Art. Henry Holt & Co., 1996.  
 Spoken, Broken and Bloody English: The Story of George Bernard Shaw, Linguaphone and Eliza Doolittle, London: Linguaphone Institute, 2002. With foreword by Lord Quirk.  
William Morris and Red House: A Collaboration Between Architect and Owner. National Trust Books, 2005. 
A Guide to Victorian and Edwardian Portraits. London: National Portrait Gallery in association with the National Trust, 2011. (With Peter Funnell)
The Pre-Raphaelite Circle. London: National Portrait Gallery. 
The Collected Letters of Jane Morris. Boydell & Brewer, 2012. (Editor with Frank C. Sharp) 
Christina Rossetti: A Literary Biography. London: Faber & Faber, 2012.

References

External links 
http://janmarsh.blogspot.co.uk

Living people
British art curators
British non-fiction writers
British art historians
Women art historians
British art critics
British women historians
Alumni of the University of Cambridge
Alumni of the University of Sussex
Year of birth missing (living people)
Fellows of the Royal Historical Society
People associated with the National Portrait Gallery